"Wight Is Wight" is a French song by Michel Delpech. It sold over one million copies, and was awarded a gold disc. Released in 1969 it became a big hit in France and internationally. This hippy-influenced song was inspired by the first editions of the Isle of Wight Festival, mentioning Bob Dylan who played there in 1969. Donovan is also named in the chorus, even though he wouldn't appear at the festival before 1970, a few months after the song was released.

The title is a pun based on Los Bravos' 1966 hit single Black Is Black, covered by Johnny Hallyday on the same year, as "Noir c'est noir".

Other versions
The following year, it was recorded with lyrics in English by the British singer Sandie Shaw. It was released by Pye as her second single of the 1970s, with "That's the Way He's Made" as a B-side, written by Chris Andrews.

The same year, the italian group Dik Dik had made a version in Italian language, with the lyrics of Claudio Daiano and Alberto Salerno, which was released as the single, "L'isola di Wight/Innamorato".

It was also recorded in 1970 by the Belgian singer John Terra in Flemish.

Track listing 

 "Wight Is Wight" (Delpech, Vincent) – 3:00
 "Wight Is Wight (instrumental)" (Delpech, Vincent) – 3:00

Chart performance

References

External links
Article about Michel Delpech at the French Wikipedia

Songs written by Michel Delpech
1969 singles
1969 songs
French songs
Barclay (record label) singles
Songs about rock music
Songs about the United Kingdom
Number-one singles in France
Sandie Shaw songs
1970 singles
Pye Records singles